Tracy e Polpetta (“Tracy and Polpetta”) is a sitcom created to teach children English.

The protagonists are a ten-year-old English girl, Tracy, her magical talking garbage can, Bill the Bin, and the two characters who live with her and speak Italian: the mole Polpetta, and Van Ruben, the ghost of a pirate who lived in the 17th century.

Every episode deals with an important topic, such as civil coexistence, diversity, environmental protection, and education.

See also
List of Italian television series

External links
 

Italian television series
2003 Italian television series debuts
2008 Italian television series endings
2000s Italian television series
RAI original programming